Chen You was a Muslim Hui general of the Ming dynasty.

Philanthropy
In the year 1447, a Muslim Hui general Chen You, financed the restoration of the Dong Si Mosque (literally meaning: Propagation of Brightness Mosque).

References

Chinese Muslim generals
Hui people
Ming dynasty generals